An annular solar eclipse occurred on June 28, 1908. A solar eclipse occurs when the Moon passes between Earth and the Sun, thereby totally or partly obscuring the image of the Sun for a viewer on Earth. An annular solar eclipse occurs when the Moon's apparent diameter is smaller than the Sun's, blocking most of the Sun's light and causing the Sun to look like an annulus (ring). An annular eclipse appears as a partial eclipse over a region of the Earth thousands of kilometres wide.

Places inside the annular eclipse included a part of North America including a part of Central Mexico around Mexico City and Orlando and Daytona Beach, Florida in the USA which occurred in the morning hours. In Africa, it included Rosso, Mauritania, the northernmost part of Senegal, Bamako and the southwestern French Sudan (now Mali), the southwesternmost part of Upper Volta (now Burkina Faso) and northern British Gold Coast (now Ghana) which occurred before sunset.

Related eclipses

Solar eclipses 1906–1909

Saros 135 

It is a part of Saros cycle 135, repeating every 18 years, 11 days, containing 71 events. The series started with partial solar eclipse on July 5, 1331. It contains annular eclipses from October 21, 1511 through February 24, 2305, hybrid eclipses on March 8, 2323 and March 18, 2341 and total eclipses from March 29, 2359 through May 22, 2449. The series ends at member 71 as a partial eclipse on August 17, 2593. The longest duration of totality will be 2 minutes, 27 seconds on May 12, 2431.

Notes

References 

1908 6 28
1908 6 28
1908 in science
June 1908 events